Carol Kaye (née Smith; born March 24, 1935) is an American musician. She is one of the most prolific recorded bass guitarists in rock and pop music, playing on an estimated 10,000 recordings in a career spanning over 65 years.

Albums & songs

This is a partial list of albums and songs that bassist Carol Kaye played on.

 Summertime – Sam Cooke (1957)
 Donna – Ritchie Valens (1958)
 La Bamba – Ritchie Valens (1958)
 Almost In Your Arms – Sam Cooke (1958)
 Pink Shoe Laces – Dodie Stevens (1959)
 Smooth Operator – Sarah Vaughan (1959)
 Hully Gully – The Olympics (1959) 
 Zip-a-Dee-Doo-Dah – Bob B. Soxx & the Blue Jeans (1962)
 Johnny Angel – Shelley Fabares (1962)
 Rhythm of the Rain – The Cascades (1962)
 Then He Kissed Me – The Crystals (1964)
 You're Nobody till Somebody Loves You – Dean Martin (1964)
 Wish Someone Would Care – Irma Thomas (1964)
 Time Is On My Side – Irma Thomas (1964)
 Anyone Who Knows What Love Is (Will Understand) – Irma Thomas (1964)
 No Matter What Shape (Your Stomach's In) – The T-Bones (1965)
 These Boots Are Made for Walkin'  – Nancy Sinatra (1965)
 Do I Love You (Indeed I Do) – Frank Wilson (1965)
 Tainted Love – Gloria Jones (1965)
 Spanish Eyes – Al Martino (1965)
 Summer Days (and Summer Nights!!) – The Beach Boys (1965)
 Quincy's Got a Brand New Bag – Quincy Jones (1965)
 Whipped Cream & Other Delights – Herb Alpert (1965)
 Hold Me, Thrill Me, Kiss Me – Mel Carter (1965)
 California Girls – The Beach Boys (1965)
 Lipstick Traces (on a Cigarette) – The O'Jays (1965)
 Beach Boys Today – The Beach Boys (1965)
 Unchained Melody – The Righteous Brothers (1965)
 Merry Christmas  – The Supremes (1965)(side 1: tracks 2,3,4,6; side 2: tracks 1–6)
 I Hear a Symphony  – The Supremes (1966)(side 1: tracks 1,4,5)
 Bang Bang (My Baby Shot Me Down) – Cher (1966)
 Batman Theme – The Marketts (1966)
 The Temptations in a Mellow Mood – The Temptations (1966)
 Chér – Cher (1966)
 Sloop John B – The Beach Boys (1966)
 I'm Ready for Love – Martha and the Vandellas (1966)
 I Am a Rock – Simon & Garfunkel (1966)
 Smile – The Beach Boys
 The Supremes A' Go-Go  – The Supremes (1966)(side 1: tracks 2,4 ; side 2: tracks 2,4)
 Parsley, Sage, Rosemary and Thyme – Simon and Garfunkel (1966)
 Sugar Town  – Nancy Sinatra (1966)
 I Don't Need No Doctor – Ray Charles (1966)
 Pet Sounds  – The Beach Boys (1966)
 Ray Charles Invites You to Listen – Ray Charles (1967)
 You've Lost That Lovin' Feelin' – The Righteous Brothers (1967)
 River Deep, Mountain High – Ike & Tina Turner (1967)
 In the Heat of the Night – Ray Charles (1967)
 Freak Out! – The Mothers of Invention (1967)
 Love is Here and Now You're Gone  – The Supremes (1967)
 Somethin' Stupid  – Frank Sinatra and Nancy Sinatra (1967)
 The World We Knew  – Frank Sinatra (1967)
 The Beat Goes On – Sonny & Cher (1967)
 Mercy, Mercy, Mercy – The Buckinghams (1967)
 You've Made Me So Very Happy – Brenda Holloway (1967)
 The Supremes Sing Rodgers & Hart  – The Supremes (1967)(side 1: tracks 1,2,4,5,6; side 2: tracks 1,3)
 More of the Monkees  – The Monkees (1967)
 In and Out of Love  – The Supremes (1967)
 Music from Mission: Impossible – Lalo Schifrin (1967)
 Forever Changes – Love (1967)
 Expecting to Fly – Buffalo Springfield (1967)
 Wichita Lineman – Glen Campbell (1968)
 Midnight Confessions – The Grass Roots (1968)
 Accent on Africa – Cannonball Adderley (1968)
 Little Green Apples – O. C. Smith (1968)
 Song of Innocence – David Axelrod (1968)
 Neil Young – Neil Young (1968)
 More Mission: Impossible – Lalo Schifrin (1968)
 There's a Whole Lalo Schifrin Goin' On – Lalo Schifrin (1968)
 Can't Take My Eyes Off You – Andy Williams (1968)
 The Sound of Nancy Wilson  – Nancy Wilson (1968) 
 Diana Ross & the Supremes Join the Temptations  – The Supremes and The Temptations (1968)(side 1: tracks 1,5,6 ; side 2: tracks 1,5)
 Love Theme from Romeo and Juliet – Henry Mancini (1968)
 Release of an Oath – The Electric Prunes (1968)
 Livin' It Up! – Jimmy Smith (1968)
 The Temptations Wish It Would Rain  – The Temptations (1968)(side 2: track 1)
 Feelin' Alright?  – Joe Cocker (1969)
 Mannix – Lalo Schifrin (1969)
 Time Out for Smokey Robinson & The Miracles  – The Miracles (1969)(side 1: track 3)
 Raindrops Keep Fallin' on My Head – B. J. Thomas (1969)
 When I Die – Motherlode (1969)
 The Original Jam Sessions 1969 – Quincy Jones (1969)
 Reelin' with the Feelin' – Charles Kynard (1969)
 Four in Blue  – The Miracles (1969)(side 1: track 4)
 Songs of Experience – David Axelrod (1969)
 Try a Little Kindness – Glen Campbell (1970)
 Love Country Style – Ray Charles (1970)
 Pride – David Axelrod (1970)
 Gypsys, Tramps & Thieves – Cher (1971)
 Smackwater Jack – Quincy Jones (1971)
 Charles Kynard – Charles Kynard (1971)
 Volcanic Action of My Soul – Ray Charles (1971)
 A Natural Man – Lou Rawls (1971)
 Indian Reservation (The Lament of the Cherokee Reservation Indian) – Paul Revere & the Raiders (1971)
 Rock Messiah – David Axelrod (1971)
 Surf's Up – The Beach Boys (1971)
 A Message from the People – Ray Charles (1972)
 The Man From Shaft – Richard Roundtree (1972)
 Speak Softly Love – Andy Williams (1972)
 Cass Elliot – Cass Elliot (1972)
 Across 110th Street – Bobby Womack (1972)
 You've Got It Bad Girl – Quincy Jones (1973)
 The Way We Were – Barbara Streisand (1973)
 Northern Windows – Hampton Hawes (1974)
 Brasswind – Gene Ammons (1974)
 Big Man – Cannonball Adderley (1975)
 Some People Can Do What They Like – Robert Palmer (1976)
 I Heard That!! – Quincy Jones (1976)
 Shades – J. J. Cale (1981)
 The Wilsons – The Wilsons (1996)
 David Axelrod – David Axelrod (2001)
 Fast Man Raider Man – Frank Black (2006)

Soundtracks

This is a partial list of soundtracks that bassist Carol Kaye played on.

With Alfred Newman
Airport (1970)
With Billy Goldenberg
Change of Habit (1969)
Duel (1971)

With Burt Bacharach
Butch Cassidy and the Sundance Kid (1969)

With Cy Coleman

Sweet Charity (1969)

With Dave Grusin

Waterhole No. 3 (1967)
Candy (1968)
Winning (1969)
Adam at 6 A.M. (1971)

With Dee Barton
High Plains Drifter (1973)

With Dominic Frontiere
On Any Sunday (1971)

With Elmer Bernstein
Baby the Rain Must Fall (1965)
Big Jake (1971)

With Frank De Vol
Guess Who's Coming to Dinner (1967)

With Henry Mancini
Me, Natalie (1969)
Sometimes a Great Notion (1971)
The Thief Who Came to Dinner (1973)

With Jerry Goldsmith
Bandolero! (1968)
Escape from the Planet of the Apes (1971)

With J. J. Johnson
Across 110th Street (1972)
With John Williams
Daddy's Gone A-Hunting (1969)
The Poseidon Adventure (1972)
The Long Goodbye (1973)
The Paper Chase (1973)
The Sugarland Express (1974)
The Eiger Sanction (1975)

With Johnny Mandel
Harper (1966)
M*A*S*H (1970)

With Lalo Schifrin
Murderer's Row (1966)
The Fox (1967)
Where Angels Go, Trouble Follows (1968)
Coogan's Bluff (1968)
Bullitt (1968)
Dirty Harry (1971)
Magnum Force (1973)

With Leonard Rosenman
Beneath the Planet of the Apes (1970)

With Michel Legrand
 The Thomas Crown Affair (1968)
 The Happy Ending (1969)
 Le Mans (1971)
 One Is a Lonely Number (1972)

With Nelson Riddle
 Red Line 7000 (1965)
El Dorado (1966)

With Peter Schickele
Silent Running (1972)

With Quincy Jones
 The Pawnbroker (1964)
 The Slender Thread (1965)
Walk, Don't Run (1966)
Banning (1967)
In the Heat of the Night (1967)
In Cold Blood (1967)
A Dandy In Aspic (1968)
The Split (1968)
Mackenna's Gold (1969)
The Lost Man (1969)
Bob & Carol & Ted & Alice (1969)
The Italian Job (1969)
Cactus Flower (1969)
They Call Me Mister Tibbs! (1970)
Killer By Night (1972)
The Hot Rock (1972)
The New Centurions (1972)

With Vic Mizzy
Don't Make Waves (1967)
The Shakiest Gun in the West (1968)

TV Shows

This is a partial list of TV Shows that bassist Carol Kaye played on.

With Billy Goldenberg
Kojak (1973)

With Charles Fox
Wonder Woman (1976)
The Love Boat (1977)
With David Shire
McCloud (1970)
Alice (1976)

With Frank De Vol
The Brady Bunch (1969)

With Irving Szathmary
Get Smart (1965)

With Jerry Fielding
Hogan's Heroes (1965)

With Jerry Goldsmith
Room 222 (1969)

With John Williams
Lost in Space (1965)

With Lalo Schifrin
Mission: Impossible (1966)
Mannix (1967)

With Morton Stevens
Hawaii Five-O Theme (1968)

With Patrick Williams
The Streets of San Francisco (1972)
With Quincy Jones
Ironside (1967)
The Bill Cosby Show (1969)

With Richard Markowitz
The Wild Wild West (1965)

With Vic Mizzy
The Addams Family (1964)
Green Acres (1965)

Live album
 Joe Williams Live – Joe Williams (1973)

Archival recordings
 Guitars ’65 (California Creamin’) - Carol Kaye (1965)
 Better Days - Carol Kaye (1971)
 I Don't Know What's On Your Mind – Carol Kaye and Spider Webb (1976)
 Picking Up On The E-String - Carol Kaye (1995)

References

Discographies